Blank Generation may refer to:

 Blank Generation (album), by Richard Hell & The Voidoids, released in 1977
 Blank Generation (song), the title track to the above album
 Blank Generation (literary), literary genre
 The Blank Generation, a 1976 music documentary
 Blank Generation (1980 film), featuring Richard Hell & The Voidoids